Raheela Yahya Munawar (born 10 June 1957) is a Pakistani politician who was a Member of the Provincial Assembly of the Punjab, from June 2013 to May 2018. She was a member of the National Assembly of Pakistan from 2002 to 2007.

Early life and education
She was born on 10 June 1957 in Gujranwala.

She has completed graduation and earned the degree of Bachelor of Arts.

Political career

She was elected to the National Assembly of Pakistan as a candidate of Pakistan Muslim League (Q) on a reserved seat for women in 2002 Pakistani general election. In August 2003, she was appointed Parliamentary Secretary for Health.

She was elected to the Provincial Assembly of the Punjab as a candidate of Pakistan Muslim League (N) on a reserved seat for women in June 2013.

In May 2018, she joined Pakistan Tehreek-e-Insaf.

References

Living people
Punjab MPAs 2013–2018
1957 births
Pakistan Muslim League (N) politicians
Pakistani MNAs 2002–2007
Women members of the National Assembly of Pakistan
21st-century Pakistani women politicians
Women in Punjab, Pakistan politics